The Roman theatre of Tarraco was a Roman theatre built in Tarraco (now Tarragona, Catalonia region) in the time of Augustus in the area of the local forum and the port, the planners took advantage of the steep slope of the hill to build part of the seating.

Despite much of it having been destroyed during the 20th century, the remains of three fundamental parts of the structure are still visible; the cavea (seating), the orchestra and the scaena. The ruins can be seen from the purpose-built lookout point.

See also
 List of Roman theatres

References 

Buildings and structures in Tarragona
Ancient Roman buildings and structures in Catalonia
Ancient Roman theatres in Spain